Manuel Alejandro Grullón Viñas (born 9 May 1953) is a businessman from the Dominican Republic. In April 2014, he was appointed the Chairman of Grupo Popular, a company whose subsidiaries include Banco Popular Dominicano, the largest private bank in the Dominican Republic. He has been president of the Banco Popular Dominicano since 1990. Forbes listed Grullón as one of the ten wealthiest men of the Dominican Republic.

Biography 
Grullón was born on 9 May 1953 in Santiago de los Caballeros to Alejandro Enrique Grullón Espaillat and Ana Dínorah Viñas Messina. His father was the founder of the Banco Popular Dominicano in August 1963, and held the position of President for 25 years. He attended the Carol Morgan School in Santo Domingo.

After completing his education in the United States, obtaining a degree in psychology from Tulane University and a master's degree in business administration from New York University, Grullón returned to his home country, becoming involved in his father's company.

Family 
Grullón comes from a prominent family in the Dominican Republic.

Since 1984 Grullón is married to Rosa Margarita Hernández de Grullón (born 1953), who is ambassador of the Dominican Republic to France and Monaco since 2013.

Professional life 
Grullón began working for the Banco Popular Dominicano in 1981. He took over the position of President in 1990 when his father Alejandro Grullón was appointed Chairman of Grupo Popular's Board of Directors. In 2001 Alejandro Grullón became the parent company's chief executive.

References 

Living people
1953 births
Descendants of Ulises Espaillat
Dominican Republic billionaires
Dominican Republic businesspeople
People from Santiago de los Caballeros
Dominican Republic people of Breton descent
Dominican Republic people of Canarian descent
Dominican Republic people of Catalan descent
Dominican Republic people of French descent
Dominican Republic people of Irish descent
Dominican Republic people of Italian descent
White Dominicans